Frank Hamilton Newcomb (10 November 184620 February 1934) was a United States Revenue Cutter Service commodore, best known for his actions at the Battle of Cárdenas during the Spanish–American War.

Early life and education
Newcomb was born in Boston, Massachusetts on 10 November 1846, the oldest of three children. His father, Hiram Newcomb was a merchant sea captain and Frank sailed on his father's ship at an early age. At the age of sixteen he served on another merchant ship that made an around the world trading voyage.

Career

U.S. Navy
In 1863 at the age of 17, Newcomb received a U.S. Navy officer's appointment as acting master's mate aboard the mortar schooner . As a part of the Atlantic Blockading Squadron during the American Civil War, Para served through many engagements. At the conclusion of the war, Newcomb resigned from the Navy and attempted to make a living as a merchant and as an officer on a merchant ship. He made trips to Europe and the West Coast, but due to a decline in United States merchant shipping after the war he was not able to make a living as a merchant mariner. In 1869, he began working for the Alabama and Chattanooga Railroad and later the Atchison, Topeka, and Santa Fe Railroad.

U.S. Revenue Cutter Service
Desiring to return to a sea career, Newcomb applied for and received a commission in the United States Revenue Cutter Service. Petrel was sold on 21 October 1873 and Newcomb was transferred to USRC W.H. Crawford, reporting aboard 25 November 1873. Newcomb was transferred to  based at Milwaukee, Wisconsin in June 1876. He was promoted to second lieutenant on 25 March 1878. In 1879, Newcomb was appointed as an assistant inspector for the United States Life-Saving Service by USLSS superintendent Sumner I. Kimball. While he served in this capacity he was placed in charge of  based in Elizabeth City, North Carolina, and he used the boat to aid in inspecting USLSS stations in south Virginia and North Carolina. The senior inspector, Lieutenant Charles F. Shoemaker and Newcomb helped establish an all black crew located on North Carolina's Outer Banks at Pea Island because some of the white crews didn't want to serve in mixed race crews. Newcomb appointed a locally recognized surfman, Richard Etheridge as the Pea Island Life-Saving Station head keeper. On 16 May 1891 Newcomb was promoted to first lieutenant.

Spanish–American War

As a first lieutenant, Newcomb reported aboard  in September 1897 as the commanding officer. Hudson was homeported at New York City's harbor at that time. Although more of a tugboat than a combat vessel, Hudson was equipped at Norfolk Naval Shipyard with two six-pound rapid fire guns fore and aft and a Colt automatic machine gun on the aft deckhouse. She also received 5/8 inch (16 mm.) armor plating around the pilothouse and deckhouse. On 23 April, Hudson departed Norfolk with orders to report to the staging area for Cuban operations at Key West, Florida. War with Spain had been declared 21 April while the cutter was in the shipyard.

On 11 May 1898, in one of the first actions off the coast of Cuba, Newcomb distinguished himself and his ship in the Battle of Cárdenas. The U.S. Navy torpedo boat  and USRC Hudson had been shelling Spanish positions. Winslow had been hit multiple times. Half her complement was dead or wounded and her captain gravely wounded. Newcomb ordered Hudson to tow Winslow out of harm's way.  Under heavy fire, she did just that, despite nearly foundering on shoals trying to fasten a line to Hudson. Newcomb's actions saved Winslow from destruction and possible capture. After the action at Cárdenas, Hudson patrolled the waters near Cárdenas Bay, capturing three vessels carrying stores while destroying a fourth. Newcomb and the crew of Hudson returned to her homeport of New York City in mid-August 1898 and a rousing welcome and a recommendation by President William McKinley to Congress to issue a gold medal for Newcomb, silver medals for his officers, and bronze medals for his enlisted crew.

A joint resolution by Congress carried out the president's wishes and medals were struck for Newcomb, his officers and men. Newcomb received the only gold medal awarded by Congress for participation in the Spanish–American War.

Later USRCS service
After Newcomb's return to New York and the receipt of the Cardenas Medal, he was awarded seven additional points on the Revenue Cutter Service's promotion system which helped him get promoted to captain in 1902. He later served as the Supervisor of Anchorages for New York Harbor, and Superintendent of Construction of Life-Saving Stations for the Atlantic Coast and Great Lakes. On 8 May 1908 he was promoted to the rank of senior captain. At age 64, Newcomb reached mandatory retirement age and he retired with the rank of captain-commandant on 10 November 1910.

Later life and death
In 1927, Newcomb received the rank of commodore on the U.S. Coast Guard Retired List.
Newcomb died of natural causes at Los Angeles, California, on 19 February 1934.  He is interred at Arlington National Cemetery with his wife, Rose Prioleau Newcomb (1863–1951.

Legacy
The United States Navy destroyer USS Newcomb (DD-586) was named in his honor.

In 2014, the Coast Guard's Command and Operations School renamed its "Top Conn" award to the Newcomb award.   It is awarded to the graduate of each Prospective Commanding Officer / Prospective Executive Officer class that best demonstrates the excellence in leadership, mentorship, and inspiration exemplified by Newcomb.

See also

Notes
Footnotes

Citations

References cited

 
 
 
 
 
 
 

1846 births
1934 deaths
Burials at Arlington National Cemetery
Congressional Gold Medal recipients
People of the Spanish–American War
People from Boston
United States Revenue Cutter Service officers
Military personnel from Massachusetts